Discourse, Figure is a 1971 book by the French philosopher Jean-François Lyotard. The philosopher Alan D. Schrift described the book as Lyotard's first major work. According to the philosopher Iain Hamilton Grant, Lyotard regarded it as one of his key works, alongside Libidinal Economy (1974) and The Differend (1983).

References

Footnotes

Bibliography
Books

 
 

1971 non-fiction books
Books by Jean-François Lyotard
French non-fiction books
Structuralism